Jaf Bar-e Simin (also Romanized as Jāf Bar-e Sīmīn, Jāfbar-e Sīmīn, and Jāf Barsīmīn; also known as Jāf, Jafail, Jāf Bareh Samīn-e ‘Olyā, and Jāfbareh-ye Sīmīn) is a village in Howmeh-ye Jonubi Rural District, in the Central District of Eslamabad-e Gharb County, Kermanshah Province, Iran. At the 2006 census, its population was 86, in 17 families.

References 

Populated places in Eslamabad-e Gharb County